Turun Palloseura, commonly known as TPS, is a professional football club based in Turku, Finland. During the 2022 season, the men's first team of the club competes in Ykkönen, the second highest tier of men's football, and the women's representative team in the Kansallinen Liiga, the highest level of women's football in Finland. Nicknamed "Tepsi", the club was founded in 1922.

TPS have won 8 League titles and 3 Finnish Cups. They play their home league matches at Veritas Stadion, with a capacity of 9,372 seats for most matches.

History
In the early stages of the UEFA Cup of the season 1987–88, TPS beat Internazionale at the San Siro stadium in Milan, thanks to a goal by Mika Aaltonen, who was later signed by Inter. They lost the return leg with 0–2, but this is widely regarded as the highest point by the club in international football.

After season 2000, TPS lost its place in Finland's Premier League and played for two seasons in the Ykkönen (eng first) in the Finnish first division. They aimed to get back up to the Premier League with determination and it took them two seasons to complete the mission. Since season 2003 TPS has again played in the Finland's Premier League, Veikkausliiga. TPS managed to get in the final of the Finnish Cup in 2005, but lost to Haka 4–1 in Finnair Stadium

Before season 2007, TPS hired famous Finnish striker Mixu Paatelainen as their manager. In his guidance TPS won bronze and so ended their ten years medalless run. After the end of season Paatelainen left for Scottish club Hibernian FC in early January 2008. Quickly TPS hired heralded Finnish manager Martti Kuusela. However Kuusela didn't get the best out of his squad and was fired mid September 2008. Overall TPS ended sixth in Veikkausliiga. So again, TPS have to get a new manager, their third in as many seasons. This time they picked Pasi Rautiainen.

In recent years, TPS has had the highest average attendance in Veikkausliiga but it has suffered from a poor rental agreement with Veritas Stadion. This has led TPS for planning to build their own stadium in Nummi. They also considered the possibility of using the Paavo Nurmi Stadion as their home ground, but these plans faced scheduling problems with Athletics competitions and were scrapped. Both Turku based teams however played few games at the Paavo Nurmi Stadion during 2014 season when the Veritas Stadion was under maintenance. After relegation TPS changed their home venue to the Urheilupuiston yläkenttä, which is close to the Paavo Nurmi Stadion in the Turku Sports Park, but is not eligible to be used in the Veikkausliiga. Future plans for home ground development have not been made public.

TPS returned to the Veikkausliiga for the 2018 season, winning the Ykkönen title on 21 October 2017 with a 1–1 draw against Honka. However, after the 2018 season, TPS was again relegated to Ykkönen, after finishing second-to-last in the league and losing the two-leg play-off against Kokkolan Pallo-Veikot (KPV), the Ykkönen runner-up. Since the 2018 season, TPS plays all home games at Veritas Stadion.

Honours

Season to season

76 seasons in Veikkausliiga
13 seasons in Ykkönen
3 seasons in Cup-format championship

Current squad

Out on loan

Management and boardroom

Management
As of 16 March 2021.

Boardroom
As of 16 March 2021

Managers

 Juuso Lampila (1939–47)
 Imre Markos (1948–50)
 Raino Suominen (1951–54)
 Leo Aaltonen (1955–59)
 Knut Gustafsson (1960–61)
 Olli Virho (1962)
 Kalevi Lehtovirta (1962)
 Leo Aaltonen (1963)
 Tage Friedfeld (1964)
 Leo Aaltonen (1964)
 Rainer Forss (1965–70)
 Paavo Nenonen (1971)
 Lars Nyström (1972)
 Manuel Gerpe (1973)
 Paavo Nenonen (1973–74)
 Olavi Laaksonen (1975–77)
 Tommy Lindholm (1978)
 Tapio Harittu (1978–80)
 Raimo Toivanen (1980–83)
 Hans Martin (1981–84)
 Timo Sinkkonen (1984)
 Rainer Forss (1985)
 Timo Sinkkonen (1985)
 Tommy Lindholm (1986–88)
 Heikki Suhonen (1989–90)
 Veijo Wahlsten (1989–90)
 Heikki Suhonen (1991)
 Tommy Lindholm (1991)
 Raimo Toivanen (1992–93)
 Pauno Kymäläinen (1993)
 Tomi Jalo (1993)
 Juha Malinen (1993–97)
 Siegfried Melzig (1998)
 Seppo Miettinen (1998–00)
 Mika Laurikainen (2001 – December 2003)
 Kari Ukkonen (January 2004 – December 2006)
 Mixu Paatelainen (October 2006 – January 2008)
 Martti Kuusela (January 2008 – September 2008)
 John Allen (September 2008 – December 2008)
 Pasi Rautiainen (January 2009 – January 2010)
 Marko Rajamäki (January 2010 – February 2014)
 Mika Laurikainen (February 2014–November 2018)
 Tommi Pikkarainen (November 2018–July 2020)
 Jonatan Johansson (July 2020–)

TPS in Europe

Women's football

The club also has a women's team which competes in the Kansallinen Liiga, the top division of women's football in Finland. TPS women took part in the national championship for the first time in 1972, and won the title in 1978. After withdrawing from the top league in 1992, they returned in 2008.

Footnotes

References

External links

Official website
TPS Supporters

 
Football clubs in Finland
Association football clubs established in 1922
Sport in Turku
 
1922 establishments in Finland